The Commemorative Medal for the Italo-Austrian War 1915–1918 was the Italian campaign medal for World War I.

History 
The medal was established by Royal Decree Of Victor Emmanuel III No. 1 241 of July 29, 1920 to award soldiers of the Italian Armed Forces and Navy who participated in hostilities against Austria-Hungary, as well as in the Dodecanese, Albania, Syria and Palestine against the Ottoman Empire. The design of the medal was developed by engraver Silvio Canevari. The medal marks not only the victory in the First World War, but also the completion of the unification of Italy and the 70th anniversary of the beginning of the revolutionary actions of 1848 for the independence of the state.

Earlier, on May 21, 1916, a special sign (bar with a stretched ribbon) was founded in Italy, which was awarded to employees of the Italian army and navy for 1 year of active service. The ribbon on the bar consisted of the colors of the Italian flag (alternating green, white and red stripes), which is repeated six times. Each additional year of service was marked on the bar with a silver asterisk.

Royal Decree No. 150 of 17 January 1918 established a sign for merchant ship crews. Although these sailors did not participate directly in combat, they were also often at risk as a result of military operations. This sign represented a ribbon of silk with eleven vertical stripes of equal width of blue and white. By Royal Decree No. 1786 of 15 July 1923, the badge was converted into a Medal of Merit for Merchant Navy Crews, completely identical to the commemorative medal, but on the ribbon of the mark for merchant ship crews.

Royal Decree No. 665 of May 3, 1918 established a sign for railway workers. The sign consisted of a silk ribbon 37 mm wide, which has 3 red stripes 9 mm wide each, alternating with two white stripes 5 mm wide each. After the introduction of the medal, some railway workers hung such medals at their own risk on the ribbon of the previously established sign, although there was no official decree on the absorption of this bar sign with a medal.

A peculiarity of this medal, made evident in the inscription on the back that mentions "minted in enemy bronze", is that the founding decree provided that it should be "cast with the bronze of the artillery taken from the enemy".

According to official data, more than 1,800,000 people were awarded the medal.

Appearance

Medal
Round bronze medal. Height with an admus — 38.5 mm, diameter — 32-32,5 mm, thickness — about 4 mm.

 Obverse: The left-turned profile of King Victor Emmanuel III in Hadrian's uniform and helmet. In a circle is the inscription "GUERRA PER L'UNITA D'ITALIA" (War for The Unity of Italy), at the bottom are the dates of 1915-1918.

 Reverse: an image of the winged Goddess of Victory on the shields of Roman legionnaires supported by Italian soldiers with the inscription: on the left - CONIATO NEL, on the right - VRONZO NEMICO (Minted from enemy bronze).

Ribbon
The decree determined that the ribbon of the medal should have the same colors as the Badge for war fatigue, which was thus replaced.
The ribbon of the medal consisted of the colors of the Italian flag (alternating green, white and red stripes), which is repeated six times. The width of the ribbon is 38 mm.
In fact, the ribbon is almost identical to that of the commemorative medal of the campaigns of the Wars of Independence, which has red on the left and green on the right, as the Italo-Austrian conflict was considered the continuation of the struggles for independence.

Clasps
Bronze clasps can be attached to the ribbon to recall the years of participation in the war with the clasps: "1915", "1916", "1917" and "1918".
In 1921, King Victor Emmanuel III also commissioned the clasps marked "Albania 1919" and "Albania 1920" for participants in this military campaign.

When wearing a full-sized medal, bronze clasps are used, when wearing the ribbon on a pad daily - a silver star is used, each of which marks 1 year of service during the war.

There are fracas copies of the Commemorative Medal, which were made by various companies and workshops, so there are a large number of miniature options.

Statute of award/Eligibility criteria 

Decree No. 1 241 of July 29, 1920 provided that the right to receive a medal at the expense of the state have:

all military personnel of the army and navy, as well as related personnel and employees of bodies and auxiliary units who at least had a total service life of at least one year and participated in the war in Italy;
persons who have suffered wounds or injuries or suffered a serious illness during the war, even if they have served for less than a year;
all soldiers of the army and navy who for at least four months participated in the war in the Greek archipelago of The Dodecanese, Albania, Syria and Palestine.
The beginning of the campaign was considered to be May 24, 1915, the end on November 4, 1918, while for the Italian military contingent in Albania, the qualifying period is considered to be August 2, 1920 (the date of signing the Italo-Albanian Convention).

The commemorative medal is worn on the left side of the chest, alone or in a group with other awards. In the presence of other awards, this medal is worn after the Commemorative Medal of the Italo-Turkish War of 1911-1912 and before the medal "For Services to the Crews of the Merchant Navy". However, since the presence of a medal of two medals is unlikely, the Medal of Victory is most often the memorial medal on the slats and pads.
The calculation of the years of campaign began on May 24, 1915 and ended on November 4, 1918, while as regards the soldiers of the contingent sent to Albania the useful period was extended until August 2, 1920, the date of the signing of the Italo-Albanian Convention.

It was also granted in a small part to non-Italian soldiers, in particular French and some Austrians, who later became Italian citizens with the annexation of Trentino, who had distinguished themselves in battle.

Manufacturers 
In connection with the need to produce a large number of copies of this award, it was produced by several companies. Therefore, the awards have small differences, and under the portrait of the king contained the stigma of the manufacturer. There are stamps of six varieties, although there are medals without manufacturer's markings:

FL & CM
M.Nelli. Inc.
Sacchini-Milano
S.I.M.
S.I.M. Roma
S.J.

Well-known awardees  
 Victor Emanuel III
 Benito Mussolini
 Ernest Hemingway

References

Military awards and decorations of Italy
Italy in World War I
Military awards and decorations of World War I
Campaign medals